Rabindra Sadan Girls' College, established in 1962, is a general degree women's college situated in Karimganj, Assam. This college is affiliated with the Assam University.

Departments

Science
Physics
Mathematics
Chemistry
Statistics
Computer Science

Arts and Commerce
 Bengali
 English
Sanskrit
History
Education
Economics
Philosophy
Political Science
Mass Communication
Commerce

References

External links
http://rabindrasadangirlscollege.in/

Universities and colleges in Assam
Colleges affiliated to Assam University
Educational institutions established in 1962
1962 establishments in Assam